August Albert Zimmermann (born Zittau, September 20, 1808 - died Munich, October 18, 1888) was a German painter.  He was the brother of painters Max, Richard, and Robert Zimmermann, and served as Max's teacher.  He was primarily self-taught as a painter, but did study at the Dresden Academy of Fine Arts and the Academy of Fine Arts Munich.

References

External links

1808 births
1888 deaths
19th-century German painters
German male painters
People from Zittau
Academy of Fine Arts, Munich alumni
19th-century German male artists